Odbojkarski klub Nova KBM Branik, commonly referred to as OK Nova KBM Branik, is a professional women's volleyball team based in Maribor that competes in the Slovenian Volleyball League. Formed in 1946, they are the most successful Slovenian women's volleyball team, winning the Slovenian League 16 times, Slovenian Cup 19 times and the regional MEVZA League 4 times. Before Slovenia's independence in 1991, the team won the Yugoslav Championship four times and reached the Yugoslav Cup final on eight occasions.

Branik's most notable international results include participation in the main phase of the CEV Women's Champions League, and reaching the final four tournament of the Women's CEV Cup.

Since 2000, the team is sponsored by Nova KBM, a bank based in Maribor. Due to the sponsorship agreement, the team has been named after the bank since the 2000–01 season.

History

Origins of volleyball in Maribor
Before World War II, the city of Maribor was known as the "cradle" of Yugoslav volleyball. Volleyball in the city was firstly played by the gymnasts of the sport club Sokol-matica in 1924. In 1931, Maribor hosted the first national championship, where the women's senior selection of Sokol-matica won the title. In the next years, the team won several more titles, including the last pre-war championship in 1940, when both the women's and men's selections won the national title. In the 1930s, the women's volleyball selection became part of the 1. slovenski športni klub Maribor, or simply 1. SSK Maribor, which is a predecessor of the Branik Sports Association, which still operates today.

Foundation, early success and decline

After World War II in 1945, 1. SSK Maribor and Sokol-matica merged into a new sports organization, named Fizkulturno društvo Maribor or simply FD Maribor. The organization was renamed as Fizkulturno društvo Polet on 27 September 1946. In the same year, the women's volleyball selection of the club was formed. In 1945, the inaugural edition of the Yugoslav Volleyball Championship was held. The Slovenian national team, which consisted mainly of players from Maribor, won the title in the women's edition. The first proper club championship was held the following season in 1946, when Polet won its first Yugoslav national title. In 1947 and 1948, Polet finished in second place behind another Slovenian team, Enotnost Ljubljana. The team was renamed Branik in 1952, when the sports organization SŠD Polet and the association football team NK Branik Maribor merged into the Mariborsko športno društvo Branik, or simply MŠD Branik. In 1953, the team, which was a mixture of young and experienced players, won its second national title after finishing above ŽOK Partizan. In the next two years, Branik finished in second place before being relegated from the first division in 1959.

The women's volleyball selection of MŠD Branik ceased to operate in 1968, after being unable to advance to the top division for several years. After two years of inactivity, the volleyball selection was reformed, and was composed mostly of youth players.

National champions of Yugoslavia

In 1976, SR Slovenia adopted a sports resolution known as the Portoroški sklepi, after which the sports associations in the country were reorganized. As a result, Branik merged with another team based in Maribor, Železničar. The reorganization of the club marked a new era for the team; firstly, Branik was promoted to the second-highest division in Yugoslavia, where they finished second in the 1977–78 season. After again finishing as the runners-up the following season, Branik finally managed to finish in first place in the 1979–80 season. In the promotion play-offs, the team defeated Gradačac and earned a promotion to the Yugoslav top division.

In 1982, the team was renamed Paloma Branik due to the sponsorship agreement with the local tissue paper company Paloma from Sladki Vrh. In the 1984–85 season, Paloma Branik managed to win the Yugoslav national title for the third time in their history, the club's first national title in 32 years. The decisive match was played against Partizan in the newly built Tabor Hall, in front of 4,000 spectators, where Branik won 3–0. The following season, Paloma Branik defended the title and won their fourth and final Yugoslav national title before the breakup of the country. Between 1983 and 1991, Paloma Branik reached the final of the Yugoslav Cup eight times, but lost on all eight occasions. In the 1980s, the team began competing in international competitions governed by the European Volleyball Confederation. In 1985–86 and 1986–87, Paloma Branik represented Yugoslavia in the CEV Champions Cup. The club was eliminated in the first round on both occasions, by CSKA Moscow and CSKA Sofia, respectively.

Slovenian League domination
In 1991, Slovenia gained independence from SFR Yugoslavia. In 1992, Paloma Branik became the first champions of the newly established Slovenian Volleyball League. In the same season, the team also won the inaugural Slovenian Volleyball Cup. As the national champions, Branik qualified for the 1992–93 CEV Champions Cup, where the team was eliminated in the first round by the Hungarian team Tungsram SC. In the 1996–97 and 1999–2000 seasons, Branik reached the main phase of the competition, but failed to obtain a single win, finishing in the last place in their group on both occasions.

In the 2000–01 season, Branik reached the semi-finals of the CEV Women's Top Teams Cup, the second-tier continental competition for women's volleyball clubs of Europe. In the final four tournament, held in Vienna, the team was eliminated by the home side SVS Post Schwechat with a score of 3–1. Branik later lost against Dynamo Odessa from Ukraine in a third place playoff, finishing the competition in fourth place.

In the first decade after Slovenia's independence, Branik was the most successful team in the country, winning eight out of eleven championships between 1992 and 2002. However, after 2002, the team declined for several years and did not win the next national title until 2009. In the 2010s, Branik became the dominant force of Slovenian volleyball for the second time, winning seven out of nine national championships between 2011 and 2019.

In 2010, Branik won the regional Middle European League for the first time. The team have won another three regional titles in 2012, 2013 and 2015.

Name changes

Club names through history:

 Polet (1946–1952)
 Branik (1952–1982)
 Paloma Branik (1982–1995)
 Infond Branik (1995–1998)
 Infond Meltal Branik (1998–2000)
 NKBM Meltal Maribor (2000–2001)
 Nova KBM Branik (2001–present)

Arena

Nova KBM Branik play their home matches at a 2,100 capacity Ljudski vrt Sports Hall in Maribor. In the past, they played their home games at a 3,261 capacity Tabor Hall, also located in Maribor.

Honours

Domestic 
Yugoslav Volleyball Championship
Winners (4): 1946, 1953, 1984–85, 1985–86
Slovenian Volleyball League
Winners (16): 1991–92, 1992–93, 1995–96, 1997–98, 1998–99, 1999–2000, 2000–01, 2001–02, 2008–09, 2010–11, 2011–12, 2012–13, 2013–14, 2016–17, 2017–18, 2018–19
Slovenian Volleyball Cup
Winners (19): 1991–92, 1992–93, 1993–94, 1995–96, 1997–98, 1998–99, 1999–2000, 2000–01, 2001–02, 2002–03, 2009–10, 2010–11, 2011–12, 2014–15, 2015–16, 2016–17, 2017–18, 2019–20, 2022–23

Regional 
MEVZA League
Winners (4): 2009–10, 2011–12, 2012–13, 2014–15

Players

2021−22 team

Source: Volleyball Federation of Slovenia

References

External links
Official website 

Slovenian volleyball clubs
Sport in Maribor
Volleyball clubs established in 1946
1946 establishments in Slovenia
Women's volleyball teams